Ariadne is an EP by The Clientele, released in 2004 on Acuarela Records.

Track listing
 "Enigma" - 0:40
 "Summer Crowds in Europe" - 3:12
 "The Sea Inside a Shell" - 8:32
 "Ariadne Sleeping" - 2:53
 "Impossible" - 4:25

References

2004 EPs
The Clientele albums